The 1981 FIVB Women's U20 World Championship was held in Mexico City, Mexico from October 16 to 26, 1981. 15 teams participated in the tournament.

Qualification
A total of 15 teams qualified for the final tournament. In addition to Mexico, who qualified automatically as the hosts, another 14 teams qualified via four separate continental tournament.

 * Australia replaced Singapore.
 ** Spain replaced East Germany.
 *** China didn't participate in Asian Championship because they did not maintain any relations with South Korea. Officially they were in War.
 **** Bolivia declined to participate.

Pools composition

First round 

  declined to participate.

Second round

Preliminary round

Pool A

|}

|}

Pool B

|}

|}

Pool C

|}

|}

Pool D

|}

|}

Second round

Pool A1 (1st–8th)

|}

|}

Pool A2 (1st–8th)

|}

|}

Pool B1 (9th–16th)

|}

|}

Pool B2 (9th–16th)

|}

|}

Final round

13th–15th places

Classification 13th and 15th

|}

Classification 13th

|}

9th–12th places

Classification 9th and 12th

|}

Classification 11th

|}

Classification 9th

|}

5th–8th places

Classification 5th and 8th

|}

Classification 7th

|}

Classification 5th

|}

Championship round

Semifinals

|}

Bronze medal match

|}

Gold medal match

|}

Final standing

External links
 Informational website.

World Championship
Volleyball
FIVB Volleyball Women's U20 World Championship
1981 in youth sport